Kenneth Higgins (26 December 1919 – 22 January 2008) was a British cinematographer who worked on both television and film.

He was nominated at the 39th Academy Awards for Best Cinematography-Black and White for his work on the film Georgy Girl.

Selected filmography

The Infamous John Friend (1959)
Terminus (1961)
French Dressing (1964)
Swinger's Paradise 
Darling (1965)
Up Jumped a Swagman (1965)
Georgy Girl (1966)
The Idol (1966)
The Spy with a Cold Nose (1966)
Cop-Out (1967)
Hot Millions (1968)
Salt and Pepper (1968)
Midas Run (1969)
The Virgin Soldiers (1969)
Julius Caesar (1970)
You Can't Win 'Em All (1970)
Lady Chatterly Versus Fanny Hill (1971)
I'm Not Feeling Myself Tonight (1976)
Golden Rendezvous (1977)
The Strange Case of the End of Civilization as We Know It (1977)

References

External links
 

1919 births
2008 deaths
British cinematographers
Film people from London